Flash notes may refer to:

 Counterfeit money § Money art, parodies of banknotes
 Flashnotes, online marketplace for study guides etc.